Copelatus cubaensis is a species of diving beetle. It is part of the genus Copelatus in the subfamily Copelatinae of the family Dytiscidae. It was described by Schaeffer in 1908.

References

cubaensis
Beetles described in 1908